Cleaner is the name of a German project specializing in electronic music.  Formerly known as Cleen, Myer released several albums on the American industrial music record label, Metropolis Records, as well as the labels Zoth Ommog and Accession Records.

History
Cleen began as a side project of Haujobb's Daniel Myer, who teamed up with vocalist Thorsten Meier for the first few releases, beginning with 1997's Designed Memories.  After the release of their second album, Thorsten Meier left to pursue other interests, and Daniel Myer assumed all musical and vocal duties.  For the third release, Solaris,  Myer changed the name of Cleen to Cleaner. Cleen, Cleaner, and Clear Vision have often been described as more synthpop oriented than Haujobb.

At this time, all of the Cleen and Cleaner releases are out of print.  Daniel Myer continues to record with Haujobb and his numerous other projects, including the recently formed Clear Vision, which appears to be another linguistic twist in the Cleen / Cleaner family.

Discography
Designed Memories, 1998, CDEP
Second Path, 1999, CD
The Voice, 2000, MCD – #57 DAC Top 100 Singles of 2000
Solaris, 2000, CD (as Cleaner) – #13 CMJ RPM Charts
The Call, 2002, CDS (as Clear Vision)
Deception, 2002, CD (as Clear Vision)

See also
Haujobb

References

External links
D. Myer official website

Electro-industrial music groups
German synthpop groups
Metropolis Records artists
Zoth Ommog Records artists